Albertine Agnes of Nassau (April 9, 1634 – May 26, 1696), was the regent of Friesland, Groningen and Drenthe during the minority of her son Henry Casimir II, Count of Nassau-Dietz, between 1664 and 1679.  She was the sixth child and fifth daughter of stadtholder Frederick Henry, Prince of Orange and Amalia of Solms-Braunfels.

Life
Albertine Agnes was born in The Hague and was the sixth of nine children born to her parents. Some of her siblings died in childhood. Albertine and four other siblings lived to adulthood. Her surviving siblings were: William II, Prince of Orange, Luise Henriette of Nassau, Henriette Catherine of Nassau and Mary of Nassau. 

In 1652 she married her second-cousin, William Frederick, Prince of Nassau-Dietz.

Regency 

After the death of her husband in 1664, she became regent for her son in Friesland, Groningen and Drenthe. In 1665, both England and the bishopric of Münster declared war on the Netherlands. Because most of the money for defence had been used for the fleet, the army had been neglected. When Groningen was under siege, Albertine Agnes hastened to the city to give moral support. Pressure by King Louis XIV of France, then an ally, forced the forces of her enemies retreated, but six years later the Netherlands were attacked from the south, by the French under Louis XIV and from the north by the bishop of Münster and archbishop of Cologne. She organised defence and kept morale high.

In 1676 Albertine Agnes bought a country seat in Oranjewoud and called it Oranjewoud Palace. It was here that she died in 1696. She also had Schloss Oranienstein built from 1672 as her new residence at Diez.

Issue
She had three children:

 Amalia of Nassau-Dietz, married to John William III, Duke of Saxe-Eisenach
 Henry Casimir II, Count of Nassau-Dietz, married to Henriëtte Amalia of Anhalt-Dessau
 Wilhelmina Sophia Hedwig (1664–1667)

Ancestors

References

External links

The Correspondence of Albertine Agnes van Oranje-Nassau in EMLO
"Women in power 1640–1670" last accessed August 4, 2007

Albertine Agnes
17th-century Dutch women
Albertine Agnes of Nassau
Nobility from The Hague
1634 births
1696 deaths
Albertine Agnes
Daughters of monarchs